Trappensee is a small lake in the eastern city of Heilbronn in northern Baden-Wuerttemberg, Baden-Wuerttemberg, Germany.
In the middle of the lake there is the Trappensee castle, a water castle that dates back to the 16th century and was rebuilt in its current shape in the 18th century.

Lakes of Baden-Württemberg
LTrappensee